Smoliar or Smolyar is an East Slavic surname, a transliteration from Cyrillic 'Смоляр', literally meaning the occupation of  wood distiller, see :pl:Smolarz. Notable people with the surname include:

Alexander Smolyar, Russian racing driver
Artem Smoliar, Russian male volleyball player

See also

Smolar
Smolarz (disambiguation)

Occupational surnames